Isaac Weaver Jr. (March 1, 1756– May 2, 1830) was an American politician from Pennsylvania who served as a Democratic-Republican member of the Pennsylvania House of Representatives 1797 to 1803 including as Speaker from 1800 to 1803. He resigned as Speaker on March 1, 1803, to take the office of Pennsylvania Treasurer, at that time an office elected by the General Assembly.

He served as a member of the Pennsylvania Senate for the 18th district from 1809 to 1812 and again from 1817 to 1820 as Speaker of the Senate.

Early life
He was born in Providence Township, Pennsylvania to Isaac and Sarah Dell Weaver. He received his education in Philadelphia, Pennsylvania and became a schoolmaster.

He served as a captain in the Chester County Militia during the American Revolutionary War. After the war, he married Abigail Price and together they had 11 children.  He moved to Waynesburg, Pennsylvania.  His first wife Abigail died in 1813 and he was remarried to Rachel Husbands.

Death
He died on May 2, 1830 and was originally interred at the family farm near Castle Run in Greene County, Pennsylvania. He was reinterred to Jefferson Cemetery in Jefferson, Pennsylvania.

See also
 Speaker of the Pennsylvania House of Representatives

References

|-

1756 births
1830 deaths
18th-century American politicians
19th-century American politicians
Burials in Pennsylvania
Members of the Pennsylvania House of Representatives
Pennsylvania Democratic-Republicans
Pennsylvania militiamen in the American Revolution
Pennsylvania state senators
People from Delaware County, Pennsylvania
Speakers of the Pennsylvania House of Representatives
State treasurers of Pennsylvania